Anthony Walongwa (born 15 October 1993) is a Congolese professional footballer who currently plays as a centre-back for Fontenay.

Club career
A youth product of Nantes, Walongwa made his professional debut in May 2016, in a 2–1 Ligue 1 defeat against Caen.

International career
Walongwa was born in France to a father from the Democratic Republic of the Congo and a mother from the Republic of Congo. He represented the DR Congo U20s in the 2013 Toulon Tournament, and the 2015 African U-20 Championship qualification.

References

External links
 
 
 Anthony Walongwa foot-national.com Profile

1993 births
Living people
Footballers from Nantes
Association football defenders
Democratic Republic of the Congo footballers
Democratic Republic of the Congo under-20 international footballers
French footballers
Democratic Republic of the Congo people of Republic of the Congo descent
French sportspeople of Democratic Republic of the Congo descent
French sportspeople of Republic of the Congo descent
Ligue 1 players
Championnat National players
Championnat National 2 players
Championnat National 3 players
FC Nantes players
Grenoble Foot 38 players
Black French sportspeople